Wallis and Futuna elects on the territorial level a legislature. The Territorial Assembly (Assemblée Territoriale) has 20 members, elected for a five-year term by proportional representation in multi-seat constituencies. 
Wallis and Futuna has a multi-party system, with numerous parties in which no one party often has a chance of gaining power alone, and parties must work with each other to form coalition governments.

Elections

1962 Territorial Assembly election

1987 Territorial Assembly election

1992 Territorial Assembly election

1997 Territorial Assembly election

2002 Territorial Assembly election

2007 Territorial Assembly election

2012 Territorial Assembly election

2017 Territorial Assembly election

Referendums

1959 Wallis and Futuna status referendum

See also
 Electoral calendar
 Electoral system
'Uvea mo Futuna (Wallis and Futuna online magazine)